The North Coast Cartel was a drug cartel operating in northern Colombia between in 1980 and 2010, mostly controlling the area of the Colombian Caribbean coast illegal drug trade flow from other regions of Colombia and neighboring countries and local production. Its operations center was the city of Barranquilla. Other name was the Barranquilla Cartel (Spanish: Cartel de Barranquilla).

History 
The leader of this cartel was Alberto Orlandez Gamboa  El Caracol (The Snail), who in a vendetta eliminated the Valdeblanquez family. He was arrested on June 6, 1998 and extradited later to the United States where he pleaded guilty for numerous drug-related crimes. Its members were Jose Reinaldo Fiallo Jacome El Nano, Jairo Duran Fernandez El Mico Duran (The Monkey), the congressman for the department of Magdalena Alex Duran Fernandez, brother of El Mico Duran, Cruz Antonio Gonzalez Peña Crucito Gonzalez, Gustavo Salazar Bernal, Alexander Enrique Batalla El Alto (The High) or Alex and The Nasser Arana family. This family was led by Julio Cesar Nasser David a.k.a. El Turco (The Turkish) and his ex-wife Sheila Arana W.

Other notable members of the North Coast cartel were the Nasser Arana family clan who owned several assets in Barranquilla and numerous properties in Barranquilla and The Coast, including the luxurious Hotel El Prado, which is now property of the Colombian government and next to enter into an open tender process. The most prominent members of the clan were Julio Cesar Nasser David and his ex-wife Sheila Arana W (divorced in 1984). She was captured in Switzerland and then extradited to the United States in September 1994. She accepted being responsible for sending to the United States some 30 shipments of cocaine and marijuana between 1976 and 1994, totalizing over a million of tonnes of drugs in that country. Her ex-husband was also covered by the extradition but he died of natural causes, on January 13, 2000 in the prison of La Picota in Bogotá.

After serving time in prison, their son Jorge "Tito" Nasser was killed by gunmen in Barranquilla exiting a local gym 20 days after his acquittal. Carlos Alberto Nasser was captured in 1998. Claudia Nasser and Carlos Alberto "Capeto" Nasser were found guilty of money laundering and illegal enrichment. In 2001 Carlos Alberto "Capeto" Nasser Arana and his sister Claudia Nasser Arana was acquitted for an especialized judge of Bogotá.

Other members

 José Reinaldo Fiallo Jácome, aka "El Nano": ordered the murder of the vallenato singer of the Binomio de Oro band, Rafael Orozco Maestre , which occurred on June 11, 1992 in Barranquilla, and was committed by his bodyguard Sergio Gonzalez, aka "Tato". Both Fiallo and Gonzalez were killed in a restaurant in Medellín on November 18, 1992 on the orders of Pablo Escobar.
Jairo (a.k.a. El Mico) and Álex Durán Fernández: Jairo married with then Miss Colombia Maribel Gutierrez in 1991 and Alex was a congressman by Magdalena department. In January 1992, the Duran brothers were defendants of narcotrafficking and money laundering by Spanish justice. Between October 1992 and February 1993 respectfully Jairo and Alex Duran were killed in a purge. 
Cruz Antonio Gonzalez Peña a.k.a. Crucito Gonzalez, killed in a bar called Champagne Vallenato in Barranquilla with other 6 people by gunmen, he was a collaborator of Alberto Orlandez Gamboa a.k.a. "El Caracol".
 Rafael De La Torre Rojas a.k.a. El Burro (The Donkey) born in Barranquilla  believed to be mentor and collaborator of El Caracol played a major role in the founding of the cartel. Actually believed to reside in Miami, Florida or Paterson, New Jersey.
 Gustavo Salazar Bernal, killed in Cartagena on August 30, 2001 by gunman Jhon Fredy Orrego Marín who was associated to the Norte del Valle Cartel. He was killed for being responsible for "losing" a shipment of drugs property of "Los Mellizos" (The Twins) with destiny to Europe. His brother Fernando Salazar Bernal was also killed by the Norte del Valle Cartel.
 Alexander Enrique Batalla, a.k.a. "Jesucristo", "El Alto" (The High) or "Alex", older collaborator of El Caracol, and boss of an old organization of traffic of heroine with aeronautical technics in airports of Colombia and United States for introduce drugs in that country. He was extradited in 2010.

See also
Narcotrafficking in Colombia
Hugues Rodriguez Fuentes
Rodrigo Tovar Pupo

References

External links
 US Office of the Treasury - some Nasser Arana clan assets

Disbanded Colombian drug cartels
Organized crime groups in Venezuela